The Montreal Matrix were an American Basketball Association team based in Montreal, Quebec, Canada. The team's first season was in 2005–06 and their home court was the Centre Pierre Charbonneau. The team was known as the Montreal Royal during the 2007–08 season, before returning to its original name.

History
The Matrix reached the playoffs in their first season of play. They won their first playoff game against the Ohio Aviators. They reached the Round of 16 before losing to the Maryland Nighthawks. In their 2007–08 season as the Montreal Royal, the team reached the Final 8 in Quebec City, before losing to the Manchester Millrats in overtime.

The team is now defunct. Another pro basketball team started in its place for the 2008-2009 season, known as the Montreal Sasquatch of the Premier Basketball League. Unfortunately that team after undergoing ownership problems and playing only a handful of games is now defunct as well. Montreal's most recent defunct pro basketball team is the Montreal Jazz of the National Basketball League of Canada, who were only active for the 2012-2013 season.

See also
American Basketball Association (2000–)
Canada Basketball
Canadian Interuniversity Sport
Canadian Colleges Athletic Association
Montreal

External links 
 Official Montreal Matrix Website (launched July 24, 2008)
 Previous Montreal Royal Website (launched February 7, 2008)
 History of amateur and professional basketball in Canada at Frozen Hoops
 Frozen Hoops ABA - Frozen Hoops ABA. Covering the Canadian teams.
 News article announcing name (subscription required)

Defunct American Basketball Association (2000–present) teams
Ma
Defunct basketball teams in Canada
Basketball teams established in 2005
Basketball teams disestablished in 2008
2005 establishments in Quebec
2008 disestablishments in Quebec